is a temple located in Fujisawa, Kanagawa, and serves as the headquarters of the Ji-shū branch of Pure Land Buddhism, related to Ippen. The formal name of the temple is Tōtaku-san Muryōkō-in Shōjōkō-ji.  As the head priest of the temple, Tōtaku Shōnin, also bears the inherited title Yugyō Shōnin (遊行上人), the temple has become familiarly known as Yugyō-ji (遊行寺) in recent years.  The temple is also sometimes referred to as Fujisawa-dōjō.

References 
Shigeru Araki, Kichizō Yamamoto, "Sekkyō Bushi" (Heibon-sha, 1973)
Shunnō Ōhashi, "Ippen to Ji-shū Kyōdan" (Newton Press, 1978)

External links 

 Ji-shu Sōhonzan Yugyō-ji web site
 Yugyō-ji Houmotsukan
 Yugyō-ji Keidai Zu (late Edo period)
 Kunishitei Bunkazai Database

Buildings and structures in Fujisawa, Kanagawa
Buddhist temples in Kanagawa Prefecture
Pure Land temples
Ji temples